Nepenthes thai is a tropical pitcher plant endemic to peninsular Thailand. It grows on limestone hills at elevations of 500–600 m above sea level.

Nepenthes thai has no known natural hybrids.

References

 Mey, F.S. 2014. 'Nepenthes of Indochina', my 2010 ICPS lecture now on Youtube. Strange Fruits: A Garden's Chronicle, February 3, 2014.

External links
Nepenthes of Indochina

thai
Endemic flora of Thailand
Carnivorous plants of Asia
Plants described in 2009
Taxa named by Martin Cheek